Sondheim is a surname. Notable people with the surname include:

 Alan Sondheim, American poet and critic
 Erna Sondheim (1904–2008), German female fencer
 Stephen Sondheim (1930–2021), American stage musical and film composer and lyricist

Sondheimer 
  (1840, Eppingen - 1899, Heidelberg), German rabbi
 Franz Sondheimer (1926–1981), German-British chemist

German-language surnames
Jewish surnames
Yiddish-language surnames